The Barbados Cycling Union or BCU is the national governing body of cycle racing in Barbados.

The BCU is a member of the UCI and COPACI.

External links
 Barbados Cycling Union official website

Cycle racing organizations
CyclingB
Cycling